Autorickshaw is a Canadian world music band that performs a blend of Indian Carnatic and Hindustani music with Western pop, funk, and jazz. Formed in 2003 in Toronto, the group consists of vocalist Suba Sankaran, tabla player Ed Hanley, and bassist and beatboxer Dylan Bell.

They are three-time Juno Award nominees for World Music Album of the Year, receiving nominations at the Juno Awards of 2005 for Four Higher, at the Juno Awards of 2008 for So the Journey Goes, and at the Juno Awards of 2018 for Meter.

The band has regularly toured both Canada and India.

Band members
 Suba Sankaran – vocals
 Ed Hanley – tabla
 Dylan Bell – bass, beatboxing

Discography
 Autorickshaw (2003)
 Four Higher (2004)
 So the Journey Goes (2007)
 The Humours of Autorickshaw (2013)
 Meter (2017)

References

External links
 

Canadian world music groups
Musical groups from Toronto
Musical groups established in 2003
Canadian Folk Music Award winners